Stelios Nakas (born 27 January 1994 in Volos) is a Greek professional footballer. He currently plays for Brandenburger SC Süd 05.

References

External links

Greek footballers
Greek expatriate footballers
Living people
1994 births
Association football midfielders
Xanthi F.C. players
A.S.D. Roccella players
Footballers from Volos